is a 1953 Japanese horror film directed by Ryohei Arai and produced by Daiei Film. Filmed in black and white in the Academy ratio format, it stars Takako Irie and Kotaro Bando.

A prior version of the story, titled Arima Neko, was released in 1937.

Plot
Okoyo, the mistress of Lord Arima, fears that she is being replaced by a younger woman named Otaki. In a fit of jealousy, she kills the younger girl. The dead woman's cat licks her blood and becomes a demon, seeking revenge on Okoyo. There are scenes of disembodied heads floating around and one in which the ghost, with her hands folded in like a cat's paws, forces two of her victims to tumble around repeatedly.

Cast
 Takako Irie
 Michiko Ai
 Kōtarō Bandō
 Teruko Ōmi
 Yoshitaro Sadato
 Shōsaku Sugiyama

See also 
 Japanese horror
 Ghost-Cat of Gojusan-Tsugi - a 1956 film directed by Bin Kado
 Ghost-Cat Wall of Hatred - a 1958 film directed by Kenji Misumi

References

External links 
 
 

Japanese horror films
Japanese black-and-white films
1953 films
Kadokawa Dwango franchises
Daiei Film films
1953 horror films
Films directed by Ryohei Arai
1950s fantasy films
1950s Japanese films